Donica Creek is a stream in northeast Coles County in the U.S. state of Illinois. It is a tributary to the Little Embarras River.

Donica Creek bears the name of Hiram and Samuel Donica, local pioneers.

See also
List of rivers of Illinois

References

Rivers of Coles County, Illinois
Rivers of Illinois